A Chamber of Corporations is a key element in the idea of corporatism and could mean either:
 The Chamber of Fasces and Corporations was the lower chamber of the bicameral legislature of Italy between 1939 and 1943, replacing the popularly elected Chamber of Deputies.
 In Portugal during the Estado Novo regime, the upper chamber was dubbed Corporative Chamber.
 In Estonia, between 1924 and 1940, there were up to 17 Corporate chambers.